Konstantinos Mousouros (1807–1891), also known as Kostaki Musurus Pasha, was an Ottoman Greek diplomatic official of the Ottoman Empire who served as ambassador to Greece, Austria, Great Britain, Belgium, and the Netherlands.

Biography 

He was born in 1807 in Constantinople (Istanbul) to a distinguished Phanariote family. His brother, Pavlos Mousouros, also became a diplomat. Mousouros became the first ambassador of the Ottoman Empire to the newly independent Kingdom of Greece in 1840, a position he kept until 1848. In 1847–48 he was a central figure in the events known as Mousourika (Μουσουρικά), which led to his temporary recall and the breakdown of relations between the two states. On his return to Athens he survived an assassination attempt, leading to his transfer to Vienna. In 1850 he took up the post of Ottoman ambassador to the Great Britain and Ireland, which he kept for 35 consecutive years, until his retirement in 1885. During the same period, he also served as ambassador to the Netherlands (1861–77) and Belgium (1861–75). In 1876–78, he was ex officio a member of the short-lived Senate of the Ottoman Empire.

Well educated, in 1883 Mousouros translated Dante's Divine Comedy into ancient Greek and Turkish. He was married and had a son, Stephanos Mousouros, who later became Prince of Samos.

Honours 
Imperial Order of Ottomania; 2nd Class
Imperials Order of Midjidie, 1st Class.
Grand Cordon of the Order of Leopold
Grand Cross in the Order of the Southern Cross
Grand Cross in the Order of Saints Maurice and Lazarus
Knight Grand Cross in the Order of the Netherlands Lion
Grand Commander in the Order of the Redeemer

References

1807 births
1891 deaths
Phanariotes
Greeks from the Ottoman Empire
Konstantinos
Ambassadors of the Ottoman Empire to Austria
Ambassadors of the Ottoman Empire to Greece
Ambassadors of the Ottoman Empire to the United Kingdom
Translators from Italian
Members of the Senate of the Ottoman Empire
19th-century translators
Diplomats from Istanbul